Dogiyai Regency is one of the regencies (kabupaten) in the Indonesian province of Central Papua. It covers an area of 7,052.92 km2 (revised from 4,237.4 km2), and had a population of 84,230 at the 2010 Census and 116,206 at the 2020 Census; the official estimate as at mid 2021 was 117,818, comprising 61,427 males and 56,391 females. The administrative centre is the town of Kigamani.

Administrative districts and villages  
When formed in 2007, the new Dogiyai Regency comprised three districts (distrik) from within the southern part of the existing Nabire Regency, but these were subsequently reconstructed into the present ten districts. The Sukikai Selatan and Piyaiye Districts were formed from the former Sukikai District. The Mapia Barat, Mapia Tengah and Mapia Districts were formed from the former Mapia District. The Dogiyai, Kamu Selatan, Kamu, Kamu Timur and Kamu Utara Districts were formed from the former Kamu District.

The following is a table of the current districts (kecamatan) - and of the 79 villages by district - within the Dogiyai Regency, based on Statistics Indonesia, with the district areas and their populations at the Censuses of 2010 and 2020, together with the official estimates as at mid 2021. The villages named in bold below are the locations of the district administrative centres.

References

External links
Statistics publications from Statistics Indonesia (BPS)

Regencies of Central Papua